Tractolira is a genus of sea snails, marine gastropod mollusks in the family Volutidae.

Species
Species within the genus Tractolira include:

 Tractolira delli Leal & Harasewych, 2005
 Tractolira germonae Harasewych, 1987
 Tractolira sparta Dall, 1896
 Tractolira tenebrosa Leal & Bouchet, 1985

References

Volutidae